Molalan or Mololan or Mulalan may refer to:
Molalan, Lerik, Azerbaijan
Molalan, Masally, Azerbaijan